Luis Prieto (born 10 July 1970) is a Spanish-born film director, and screenwriter.

Early life 
Prieto was born in Madrid, Spain. He studied economics and photography in Spain and film at the California Institute of the Arts in Los Angeles where he graduated in 1994 with honors from the School of Film and Video.

Career

Early career 
From 1994 and 1999 Prieto lived in Seattle, San Francisco and Los Angeles where he worked as an editor on short films, commercials and documentaries - including the 1994 Student Academy Award Nominee The Night Voice.

In 2000, Prieto's commercial directing career began with his work for Albinana Films, in Barcelona (Spain).

In 2001, Prieto directed the short film Bamboleho, which won over 45 international awards, including Best Short Film at the first edition of Robert De Niro's Tribeca Film Festival 

and a Special Jury Mention at the 2001 Venice Film Festival.

Condon Express, Prieto's feature film directorial debut, was filmed in 2004 in Buenos Aires, Argentina.

Other projects 
In 1999, Prieto worked as a video artist for musician Peter Gabriel in Real World Studios, Box, England.

Filmography

Films

Television

References

Interviews 
 p.o.v. Number 17, March 2004 Interview

External links 
 
 Official Website
 Official Website Ho voglia di te (I Want You)
 Official Website Meno male che ci sei

1970 births
Living people
21st-century Spanish male writers
21st-century Spanish screenwriters
Film directors from Madrid
Spanish film directors
Spanish male screenwriters
Spanish television directors
Writers from Madrid